The Puna ibis (Plegadis ridgwayi) is a species of bird in the family Threskiornithidae. It is found in Argentina, Bolivia, Chile, and Peru. Its natural habitats are swamps, marshes and lakes, and most of its range is in the Andean highlands, including the puna, but locally it occurs down to sea level. It has been domesticated by the Uru people for meat and eggs.

Gallery

References

puna ibis
Birds of the Puna grassland
puna ibis
Taxonomy articles created by Polbot